The D.I.C.E. Award for Sports Game of the Year is an award presented annually by the Academy of Interactive Arts & Sciences during the academy's annual D.I.C.E. Awards. This award recognizes games that "offer the user the opportunity to virtually reproduce a sporting experience: either a realistic portrayal of an actual sport or games that reproduce for the user experience of participating in an existing competitive sport." The award initially had separate awards for console action games and computer games at the 1st Annual Interactive Achievement Awards in 1998 with the first winners being International Superstar Soccer 64 for console and FIFA: Road to World Cup 98 for computer. There have been numerous mergers, additions of sports related games. The current version was established in 2005, with its winner being Tiger Woods PGA Tour 2005.

The award's most recent winner is OlliOlli World developed by roll7 and published by Private Division.

History 
Initially the Interactive Achievement Awards had separate awards for Console Sports Game of the Year and Computer Sports Game of the Year. In 2004, there were separate console categories for Action Sports and Sports Simulations. The following year, in 2005, there would be a separate awards for Sports Game of the Year and Sports Simulation Game of the Year. Sports Simulation would be merge back as part of a single Sports Game of the Year which has been used ever since. 
Console Sports Game of the Year (1998—2003)
Computer Sports Game of the Year (1998—2004)
Console Action Sports Game of the Year (2004)
Console Sports Simulation Game of the Year (2004)
Sports Simulation Game of the Year (2005)
Sports Game of the Year (2005—present)

There was a tie between FIFA 2001 and Motocross Madness 2 for PC Sports Game of the Year at the 2001 Awards.

Winners and nominees

1990s

2000s

2010s

2020s

Multiple nominations and wins

Developers and publishers 
EA Sports has published the most nominees and published the most award winners. EA Canada has developed the most nominees and award winners. EA Canada is also the only developer that won console and computer awards with different games, being SSX for console and FIFA 2001 for computer in 2001. EA Tiburon is the second most nominated and award-winning developer. EA Tiburon is also the only developer to win both console and computer awards with the same game, being Madden NFL 2003 in 2003 and Madden NFL 2004 in 2004. Sony has been the most nominated publisher that has never won Sports Game of the Year, with its San Diego Studio being the most nominated developer that has never won.

Franchises 
EA Sports' FIFA series has been the most nominated the most and has won the most awards. Having won Computer Sports Game of the Year five years in a row from 1998 to 2002, and winning Sports Game of the Year six years in a row from 2010 to 2015. Madden NFL has second most nominations and awards, and was the only franchise to win both console and computer awards in the same year. First in 2003 and the second in 2004. MLB: The Show and NBA 2K are tied for being the most nominated franchises that have never won Sports Game of the Year.

Notes

References 

D.I.C.E. Awards
Awards established in 1998